Lowpoint-Washburn Junior/Senior High School is a public junior-senior high school in Washburn, Woodford County, Illinois.

The junior high school and senior high school are referred to separately by some sources and together in some sources, even from the school district.  The Illinois School Report Card reports the junior-senior high school as a single school.

Its mascot is a wildcat, with their team names referred to as the
Wildcats, and they compete as members of the Tri-County Conference.

References

Public high schools in Illinois
Schools in Woodford County, Illinois
Public middle schools in Illinois